The 2008 congressional elections in Mississippi were held on November 4, 2008 to determine who will represent the state of Mississippi in the United States House of Representatives.  The primary election for candidates seeking the nomination of the Republican Party or the Democratic Party was held on March 11, with a run-off being held for the Republican nomination in the first and third districts, and for the Democratic nomination in the first district.

Mississippi has four seats in the House, apportioned according to the 2000 United States Census.  Representatives were elected for two-year terms; those elected served in the 111th Congress from January 4, 2009 until January 3, 2011.  The election coincided with the United States Senate special election to fill the remainder of Trent Lott's term, the regularly scheduled 2008 United States Senate election, and the 2008 U.S. presidential election.

With the results of the 1st congressional district special election included, the Mississippi congressional delegation comprised three Democrats and one Republican. As of 2021, this is the last time in which Democrats won a majority of congressional districts from Mississippi.

Overview

District 1

This district covers the northeastern part of the state, including the cities of Columbus, Grenada, Oxford, Southaven, and Tupelo.  Democrat Travis Childers was the Representative to the district, having defeated Republican Greg Davis in an April 22 special election. Childers and Davis faced each other again in November along with Green Party candidate John Wages, Jr., a college professor and farmer; and independent candidate Wally Pang, a restaurant owner. CQ Politics forecast the race as 'Leans Democratic', and Childers was re-elected with 54.45% of the vote.

District 2

This district consists of the Mississippi Delta and most of the capital city of Jackson and is Mississippi's only majority-black district.  Democrat Bennie Thompson had been in office since 1993, when he won a special election to replace Mike Espy who had resigned to become Secretary of Agriculture under President Bill Clinton.  Thompson was challenged on the Republican side by teacher Richard Cook. CQ Politics forecasts the race as 'Safe Democrat' and Thompson was comfortably re-elected with 69.05% of the vote.

District 3

Republican Chip Pickering retired from Congress at this election after 12 years of service. The candidates were Republican Gregg Harper, attorney and chairman of the Rankin County Republican Party; Democrat Joel Gill, Pickens town alderman and a cattle broker; and independent candidate Jim Giles, a former systems engineer and white supremacist. CQ Politics correctly forecast the race as 'Safe Republican', as Harper was elected with 62.54% of the vote

District 4

Democrat Gene Taylor had represented the district since 1989. He was challenged on the Republican side by Methodist minister and Air National Guard officer John McCay III.CQ Politics forecast the race as 'Safe Democrat' and Taylor was re-elected with nearly 75% of the vote.

References

External links
Elections Division from the Mississippi Secretary of State
U.S. Congress candidates for Mississippi at Project Vote Smart
Campaign contributions for Mississippi congressional races from OpenSecrets

2008
Mississippi
United States House of Representatives